Izhevsk Airport  is an airport in Udmurtia, Russia, located 15 km east of Izhevsk. It handles small airliners.

Airlines and destinations

See also
List of the busiest airports in Russia
List of the busiest airports in Europe
List of the busiest airports in the former USSR

References

Airports built in the Soviet Union
Airports in Udmurtia